Abdul Latif Amadu (born 20 August 1993) is a Ghanaian professional footballer plays as a forward for Pietà Hotspurs.

References

External links 
 
 Profile at Dinamo Brest website

1993 births
Living people
Ghanaian footballers
Association football forwards
Berekum Chelsea F.C. players
Asante Kotoko S.C. players
FC Dynamo Brest players
KF Teuta Durrës players
F.C. Kafr Qasim players
Khaleej FC players
Al-Ansar FC (Medina) players
KF Llapi players
Pietà Hotspurs F.C. players
Liga Leumit players
Saudi First Division League players
Saudi Second Division players
Ghanaian expatriate footballers
Expatriate footballers in Belarus
Expatriate footballers in Albania
Expatriate footballers in Israel
Expatriate footballers in Saudi Arabia
Expatriate footballers in Kosovo
Expatriate footballers in Malta
Ghanaian expatriate sportspeople in Belarus
Ghanaian expatriate sportspeople in Albania
Ghanaian expatriate sportspeople in Israel
Ghanaian expatriate sportspeople in Saudi Arabia